Prestoy is a village in Tryavna Municipality, in Gabrovo Province, in northern central Bulgaria.

Prestoy Point on Graham Land, Antarctica is named after the village.

References

Villages in Gabrovo Province